Potentilla centigrana  is a species of cinquefoil found in China

References

External links
 
 

centigrana